Dunwich was a parliamentary borough in Suffolk, one of the most notorious of all the rotten boroughs. It elected two Members of Parliament (MPs) to the House of Commons from 1296 until 1832, when the constituency was abolished by the Great Reform Act.

History
However, by 1670 the sea had encroached upon the town, destroying the port and swallowing up all but a few houses so that nothing was left but a tiny village. The borough had once consisted of eight parishes, but all that was left was part of the parish of All Saints, Dunwich - which by 1831 had a population of 232, and only 44 houses ("and half a church", as Oldfield recorded in 1816).

In fact, this made Dunwich by no means the smallest of England's rotten boroughs, but the symbolism of two Members of Parliament representing a constituency that was essentially underwater captured the imagination and made Dunwich one of the most frequently-mentioned examples of the absurdities of the unreformed system.

The right to vote was exercised by the freemen of the borough. Originally, these freemen could vote even if they did not live in the borough, and at times this was abused as elsewhere, notably in 1670 when 500 non-resident freemen were created to swamp the resident voters. From 1709, however, by a resolution of the House of Commons, the franchise was restricted to resident freemen who were not receiving alms. By the 19th century, the maximum number of freemen had been set at 32, of whom the two "patrons", Lord Huntingfield and Snowdon Barne, could nominate eight each, so that between them they controlled half of the votes and needed only one other voter to gain control of elections.

Earlier, in the 1760s, Sir Jacob Downing had been the sole patron, but in theory he also was considered to have only influence, rather than the absolute power to dictate the choice of the Members. Unsurprisingly, in 1754 Downing was able to occupy one seat himself and sell the choice of the other member to the Duke of Newcastle (then Prime Minister) for £1,000; it is not recorded whether he needed to share some of this largesse with his co-operative voters.

Dunwich was abolished as a constituency in 1832, when what remained of the village became part of the new Eastern Suffolk county division.

Members of Parliament

Before 1660

1640-1832

In popular culture
Dunwich is satirised in an episode of the British television show Blackadder the Third titled "Dish and Dishonesty". Named Dunny-on-the-Wold, and like Dunwich, described as being located in Suffolk, it has a population of three cows, a dachshund called "Colin", and "a small hen in its late forties"; only one person lives there and he is the voter. After an obviously rigged election (in which it is revealed that Blackadder is both the constituency's returning officer and voter, after both his predecessors had died in highly suspicious "accidents"), Baldrick is made an MP having received all 16,472 of the votes cast.

References 
 T. H. B. Oldfield, The Representative History of Great Britain and Ireland (London: Baldwin, Cradock & Joy, 1816)
 J Holladay Philbin, Parliamentary Representation 1832 - England and Wales (New Haven: Yale University Press, 1965)
 Edward Porritt and Annie G Porritt, The Unreformed House of Commons (Cambridge University Press, 1903)

 Evelyn Wright, Forgotten families of Suffolk (The Book Castle, Dunstable, 2008)

Notes

Parliamentary constituencies in Suffolk (historic)
Constituencies of the Parliament of the United Kingdom disestablished in 1832
Rotten boroughs
Dunwich